The 1974 Texas gubernatorial election was held on November 5, 1974, to elect the governor of Texas. Incumbent Democratic Governor Dolph Briscoe was easily re-elected to a second term, winning 61% of the vote to Republican Jim Granberry's 31%. Raza Unida candidate Ramsey Muniz won 6%, while the remaining 2% were cast for other candidates.

Briscoe was sworn in for his second term on January 21, 1975. As the Constitution of Texas had been amended in 1972 to extend the governor's term from 2 years to 4 years, Briscoe became the first governor to be sworn in for a four-year term since Edmund J. Davis.

Briscoe carried 249 out of 254 counties in his landslide reelection victory. As of 2023, this remains the last time that a Democrat was reelected as Governor of Texas.

Primaries

Republican

Democratic

Results

References

Gubernatorial
1974
Texas
November 1974 events in the United States